This is a list of metropolitan areas in Northern America, typically defined to include Canada and the United States as well as Bermuda (UK), Greenland (Denmark), and St. Pierre and Miquelon (France). Northern America is sometimes listed separate from Central America, the Caribbean, and Mexico due to cultural and economic differences between the two regions within North America and in fact most are considered part of Latin America. This list only includes those metropolitan areas in Canada and the United States as the other territories in Northern America lack sufficient population to have a metropolitan area. For Canada this list includes population of the metropolitan areas in the country as counted by both the 2001 and 2011 Canadian Censuses. For the United States the data comes from both the 2000 and 2010 United States Censuses. Using decennial census data from both countries allows for the opportunities to compare growth rates between metropolitan areas in both countries. Due to slight differences in how a metropolitan area is defined by both the U.S. Census Bureau and Statistics Canada, only metropolitan statistical areas (MSAs) used in the United States and census metropolitan areas (CMAs) used in Canada are included in the table, while micropolitan statistical areas (μSAs) and census agglomerations (CAs) are not, as they are not defined as metropolitan areas by their respective agencies.

Table

References

Demographic lists
Northern America